The 2007 Cork Intermediate Hurling Championship was the 98th staging of the Cork Intermediate Hurling Championship since its establishment by the Cork County Board in 1909. The draw for the opening round fixtures took place on 10 December 2006. The championship began on 6 May 2007 and ended on 28 October 2007.

On 21 October 2007, Fr. O'Neill's won the championship after a 1–13 to 0–15 defeat of Bandon in the final at Páirc Uí Chaoimh. This was their first ever championship title in this grade. A week later, Glen Rovers ended 31 years of participation in the championship after suffering a one-point defeat by St. Finbarr's in a relegation play-off.

Fr. O'Neills' Jer O'Leary was the championship's top scorer with 0-41.

Team changes

To Championship

Promoted from the Cork Junior A Hurling Championship
 Kilworth

Relegated from the Cork Premier Intermediate Hurling Championship
 St. Finbarr's

From Championship

Promoted to the Cork Premier Intermediate Hurling Championship
 Ballymartle

Relegated to the City Junior A Hurling Championship
 Nemo Rangers

Results

First round

Second round

Third round

Relegation playoffs

Quarter-finals

Semi-finals

Final

Championship statistics

Top scorers

Overall

In a single game

References

Cork Intermediate Hurling Championship
Cork Intermediate Hurling Championship